Fernando Velázquez (born 22 November 1976) is a Spanish concert, film and TV composer. Among his best known works are the film soundtracks for Juan Antonio Bayona’s films: The Orphanage, The Impossible and A Monster Calls, for which he won the Goya Film Award for Best Original Composition in 2017.

Life and career
He studied cello at a number of different musical conservatories, including, from 1990 to 1993, Andrés Isasi in Getxo, Juan Crisóstomo Arriaga in Bilbao (1993–1997) and the Conservatory of Music Jesús Guridi in Vitoria, where he won the Excellence Award at the end of his studies. He then travelled to Paris to continue his education. He studied composition at the Royal Conservatory of Madrid from 2003 to 2007, and also holds a degree in Contemporary History from the University of Deusto (1994–1998).

From these studies came a number of opportunities for collaboration including a two year stint as a cellist for the Classical Orchestra of Santa Cecilia (1995–1997), Edinburgh University's Music Society Symphonic Orchestra in 1998, and at the Basque Country's Young Orchestra between 1999 and 2004.

In 1999, Velázquez started his career as a film composer, working with directors such as Koldo Serra for his short film Amor de Madre as well as El Trabajo, by Igor Legarreta and Emilio Pérez Pérez. He continued composing for other short films such as Torre (Óskar Santos, 2000); Hauspo Soinua (Inaz Fernández, 2000); Retruc (Francesc Talavera, 2001); Loops (Tucker Dávila, 2001); Amor, dinero y salud, por este orden (Marc Vigil, 2001); El hombre esponja (J. A. Bayona, 2002); El tren de la bruja (Koldo Serra, 2004); A las 7:35 de la mañana (Nacho Vigalondo, 2004); Temporada baja, (Sergio G. Sánchez, 2003); El soñador (Óskar Santos, 2004); El gran Zambini (Igor Legarreta y Emilio Pérez, 2005) and Dime que yo (Mateo Gil, 2008), which won the Goya Film Award for Best Short Film.

Among his compositions for feature films, which now number more than 50, it is possible to find films such as Agujeros en el cielo (Pedro Santos, 2004); The Birthday (Eugenio Mira, 2004), El síndrome de Svensson (Kepa Sojo, 2006); The Backwoods (Koldo Serra, 2006); Savage Grace (Tom Kalin, 2007); The Orphanage (J.A. Bayona, 2007), the latter film which earned Velázquez a nomination for Best Original Score at the Goya Film Awards of 2008. Additional titles include The Zone (Rodrigo Plá, 2007), Shiver (Isidro Ortiz, 2008); Sexy Killer (Miguel Martí, 2008); Spanish Movie (Javier Ruiz Caldera, 2009); For the Good of Others (Oskar Santos, 2010); Lope (Andrucha Waddington, 2010); Julia's Eyes (Guillem Morales, 2010); Devil (John Dowdle, 2010); 5 metros cuadrados (Max Lemke, 2011); BabyCall (Pål Sletaune, 2011); The Impossible (J.A. Bayona, 2012), which saw him earn his second nomination for Best Original Film Score in the Goya Film Awards of 2013. Mama (Andrés Muschietti, 2013); The Last Days (David Pastor and Álex Pastor, 2013); Zip & Zap and the Marble Gang (Oskar Santos, 2013); The Adventurer: The Curse of the Midas Box (Jonathan Newman, 2013); Spanish Affair (Emilio Martínez-Lázaro, 2014); Hercules (Brett Ratner, 2014); Crimson Peak (Guillermo del Toro, 2015); Pride and Prejudice and Zombies (Burr Steers, 2016); Gernika (Koldo Serra, 2016); Zip & Zap and the Captain's Island (Oskar Santos, 2016). A Monster Calls (J.A. Bayona, 2017) winner of the Goya Film Award for Best Original Score in 2017. The Invisible Guest (Oriol Paulo, 2016); Ozzy (Alberto Rodríguez y Nacho La Casa, 2016); The Invisible Guardian (Fernando González Molina, 2017); Deep (Julio Soto Gurpide, 2017); Submergence (Wim Wenders, 2017); Marrowbone ( Sergio G. Sánchez, 2017); Thi Mai, rumbo a Vietnam (Patricia Ferreira, 2017); Que baje Dios y lo vea (Curro Velázquez, 2017); Las leyes de la termodinámica (Mateo Gil, 2017); Los futbolísimos (Miguel Ángel Lamata, 2017), Superlópez (Javier Ruiz Caldera, 2018), Durante la tormenta (2018), Sergio (2020), Poderoso Victoria (2022) o Los renglones torcidos de Dios (2022).

He has also composed music for Documentaries such Sons of the Clouds (Álvaro Longoria, 2012) and Garbo: The Spy (Edmon Roch, 2009), winner of the Goya Film Award for Best Documentary; and TV series such Karabudjan (2010), Gominolas (2007) and Apaches (2017), Diablero (2018), Patria (2020), El inocente (2021), Alma (2022) and music music for theatre: Continuidad de los parques, de Jaime Pujol; Macbeth (Eusebio Poncela y María Ruiz, 2004); He has collaborated with the playwright Alfredo Sanzol since 2008 for theatre productions such as Sí pero no lo soy, Días estupendos, En la Luna, Aventura, La ternura, La respiración, El Gollem, El bar que se tragó a todos los españoles, .... In 2015, he composed music for Hacia la alegría-vers la joie, a theatrical production for the Festival d'Avignon, written by Olivier Py.

He also composes concert pieces such Humanity at music, the Christmas cantata Gabon dut anuntzio and Viento del Oeste for the symphony orchestra, commissioned by the Bilbao Symphony Orchestra. Amongst his upcoming projects are a cello concerto composed for the Navarra Symphony Orchestra and Asier Polo as well as a concerto for two flutes for the Asturias Symphony Orchestra. Some of these compositions has been published on his first concert music album "Viento", published in 2022 by Pentatone.

He has also produced albums and live concerts for artists such as Pasión Vega, Ken Zazpi, Amancio Prada, Raphael, Doctor Deseo, among others.

As conductor he has conducted, among others, The Euskadiko Orkestra, The Community of Madrid Orchestra, The London Philharmonic Orchestra, The RTVE Symphony Orchestra, London Metropolitan Orchestra, Malaga Symphony Orchestra, Budapest Symphony Orchestra, Royal Seville Symphonic Orchestra, Bilbao Symphony Orchestra, Extremadura Symphony Orchestra, Navarra Symphony Orchestra, Czech National Orchestra, Asturias Symphony Orchestra and Galicia Symphony Orchestra. In recent years, he has taken time to record the majority of his productions with State funded Spanish orchestras.

Awards and nominations
In 2008 Velázquez was nominated for Best Original Film Score at the Goya Film Awards for his work in The Orphanage, which awarded him the Cinema Writers Circle Medal and the Musical Award given by the Spanish General Society of Authors and Publishers. In 2012, he was awarded with the Ojo Crítico Award from RTVE in light of his "capacity to compose music specifically created for cinema that has the ability to transcend and reach its own entity". He was again nominated at the Goya Film Awards with The Imposible''' (2013) and A Monster Calls (2017). He won the Goya for the latter for Best Original Score and received the Feroz Award and the Cinema Writers Circle Award. Velázquez has also been nominated as the 2016 composer by the International Association of Musical Film Writers.

He is also a member of the America Motion Picture Arts and Sciences

World Soundtrack Awards
 2008: The Orphanage (nomination)

International Film Music Critics Association Awards
2007: Best New Composer of the Year (nomination)
2007: The Orphanage (nomination, Best Horror/Thriller Score)
2009: Garbo: The Spy (nomination, Best Documentary Score)
2012: The Impossible (win, Film Music Composition of the Year, for "Main Titles")
2012: The Impossible (nomination, Film Score of the Year)
2012: Film Composer of the Year (nomination)
2012: The Impossible (nomination, Best Drama Score)

Barcelona Film Awards
 2007: The Orphanage (nomination)

Cinema Writers Circle Awards, Spain
 2011: Lope (nomination)
 2008: The Orphanage (win)

European Film Awards
 2008: The Orphanage (nomination)

Goya Awards
 2008: The Orphanage (nomination)
 2013: The Impossible (nomination)
 2017: A Monster Calls (win)

Feroz Awards
 2017: A Monster Calls (win)

Spanish Music Awards
 2008: The Orphanage'' (win)

Original Soundtracks

Films

TV Series

References

External links
 
 

1976 births
Spanish film score composers
Male film score composers
Living people
People from Bilbao
Varèse Sarabande Records artists
Spanish male musicians
Latin Grammy Award winners